There have been two baronetcies created for persons with the surname Darell, one in the Baronetage of England and one in the Baronetage of Great Britain. As of 2014 one creation is extant.

Darell baronets, of West Woodhay (1622)

The Darell Baronetcy, of West Woodhay in the County of Berkshire, was created in the Baronetage of England on 13 June 1622 for John Darell. The title became extinct on his death in circa 1657.
Sir John Darell, 1st Baronet (d. c. 1657)

Darell baronets, of Richmond Hill (1795)

The Darell Baronetcy, of Richmond Hill in the County of Surrey, was created in the Baronetage of Great Britain on 12 May 1795 for Lionel Darell, Member of Parliament for Lyme Regis and Hedon. The fifth Baronet was High Sheriff of Gloucestershire in 1887. The sixth Baronet was a Colonel in the 1st Life Guards, a county councillor and Alderman for Gloucestershire and High Sheriff of the county in 1924. The eighth Baronet was a Brigadier in the Coldstream Guards and served as High Sheriff of Gloucestershire from 1985 to 1986. As of 2014 the title is held by the latter's son, the ninth Baronet, who succeeded in 2013.

Sir Lionel Darell, 1st Baronet (1742–1803)
Sir Harry Verelst Darell, 2nd Baronet (1768–1828)
Sir Harry Francis Colville Darell, 3rd Baronet (1814–1853)
Sir William Lionel Darell, 4th Baronet (1817–1883)
Sir Lionel Edward Darell, 5th Baronet (1845–1919)
Sir Lionel Edward Hamilton Marmaduke Darell, 6th Baronet (1876–1954) 
m. 1903 Lady Eleanor Marian Heathcote (1871–1953)
 Brother of Brigadier-General William Harry Verelst Darell (1978–1954)
Sir William Oswald Darell, 7th Baronet (1910–1959)
Sir Jeffrey Lionel Darell, 8th Baronet (1919–2013) 
Sir Guy Jeffrey Adair Darell, 9th Baronet (born 1961)

The heir apparent is the present holder's only son Harry Thomas Adair Darell (born 1995).

Notes

References 
Kidd, Charles, Williamson, David (editors). Debrett's Peerage and Baronetage (1990 edition). New York: St Martin's Press, 1990, 

Darell
1622 establishments in England
1795 establishments in Great Britain
Baronetcies in the Baronetage of Great Britain